The England rugby union try record progression charts the record number of tries scored for the England national rugby union team by individual players, or rugby footballers as they are still sometimes referred to.

Early years
The progression begins with Reg Birkett's try, scored in the first international rugby match of any code in 1871 when England succumbed to Scotland at Raeburn Place. When Birkett's try was scored, it was not worth any points in itself, but rather afforded the opportunity of the scoring side to kick a goal, or a "try at goal", which England failed to convert. Birkett, who also played association football for England, was for a short time during the match the joint international record holder as well, matching Angus Buchanan's earlier effort for Scotland. Despite the record being but a single try, Birkett's mark of one try for England stood for almost six years, although this equated at the time to just ten matches. In that time, at least a further eleven players matched the feat of scoring a try for England before William Hutchinson scored his second try of the match and his career in the eleventh England match on 5 February 1877. Hutchinson set a mark that was to last for exactly four years when Henry Taylor, who had already equalled the record, scored three times against Ireland on 5 February 1881. Taylor played in the same side as another prolific scorer of tries, George Burton. Burton equalled the mark of five tries in England's comprehensive victory over Wales in the latter's first international. In that match, on 19 February 1881, of the thirteen tries scored, Taylor scored once but Burton scored four times, which was in itself a record haul for one match that was to last until 1907. The tries scored in this match brought both players to six apiece, but as to which of these players reached that mark first is unclear. It was not until 1885 that another pairing of prolific try scorers, Wilfred Bolton and Charles Wade, both equalled the haul of six tries. Wade went on to hold the record outright for over fifteen years after he scored his seventh try on 2 January 1886 against Wales. It was Tot Robinson that was to break this record on 9 March 1901 with his mark of eight tries and no one challenged this until Arthur Hudson equalled and then broke it at Parc des Princes when England defeated France on 3 March 1910. For the third time, England was fielding a pairing of prolific try scorers, and alongside Hudson was John Birkett. John Birkett was the son of England's first try scorer, Reg Birkett and had scored the first try at Twickenham Stadium. He went on to set the England record with ten tries on 8 April 1912.

Lowe's sixty-seven year record
As Birkett's career finished, the young winger, Cyril Lowe, began his. Lowe was selected to play for England whilst still at university in 1913 and despite a six-year break due to the First World War when he flew as a fighter pilot in the Royal Flying Corps, returned to international duty and resumed scoring tries. Lowe scored eighteen times in twenty four appearances, and set the record for the most tries scored in a single Five Nations Championship when he scored eight in 1914, a record only matched by Ian Smith of Scotland, and never surpassed, even in the Six Nations era with its greater number of matches. Despite living until the age of 91,  Lowe's mark of eighteen tries, set on 10 February 1923, outlasted him and was not broken until another RAF fighter pilot, Rory Underwood, scored his nineteenth try almost sixty-seven years later on 20 January 1990. Underwood had taken thirty-eight matches to reach this mark, compared to Lowe's twenty-four. Before Lowe, other try scorers had had better scoring ratios, amongst them record holders Burton scoring six in six, Wade seven in eight, Tot Robinson eight in eight, and Hudson, nine in eight. Daniel Lambert had also scored eight tries in a career of seven appearances. Lowe's achievement has been singled out as being all the more remarkable due to the almost six year pause in the middle of his career.

Underwood's unchallenged record
Underwood went on to score thirty more tries for England over a career spanning twelve years and eighty-five matches, eventually setting a mark of forty-nine tries. He also scored once for the British Lions, bringing his career total of international tries to fifty. Lowe's total of eighteen has been surpassed by a further six players, all playing in an era of many more internationals, and when tries are worth more points relative to other scoring methods and therefore where there is more emphasis on scoring tries. Underwood's mark, however, has never been challenged, the next closest for England being Will Greenwood and Ben Cohen on 31 each.

International tries

See also
List of top England international rugby union points scorers and try scorers

Notes and references

England
try record progression
England rugby union try